Fencing events have been contested at every Asian Games since 1974 Asian Games in Tehran. They were not included in the year 1982.

Editions

Events

Medal table

List of medalists

References 
Sports123

External links 
 Asian Fencing Federation

 
Sports at the Asian Games
Asian Games
Asian Games